Uskiella is a genus of small fossil plants of Early Devonian age (around ). The diagnostic characters are naked axes branching isotomously, terminating in ellipsoidal, vertically elongate flat sporangia which split longitudinally into two valves. Spores of U. reticulata have a reticulate appearance. Coalified specimens have been reported from Wales, with a possible occurrence in Australia.

The relationships of the genus are not clear because many anatomical details remain unknown. In 2004, Crane et al. published a cladogram for the polysporangiophytes in which Uskiella is basal to the lycophytes (clubmosses and relatives).

Hao and Xue in 2013 listed the genus as a rhyniophyte.

References

Early Devonian plants
Prehistoric plant genera